Peter Todd Lalich (June 23, 1920 – February 1, 2008) was an American professional basketball player. He played for the Cleveland Rebels of the Basketball Association of America (now known as the National Basketball Association).

High school career
Lalich played basketball for East Technical High School in Cleveland, Ohio, where he captained a championship team in 1938.

College career
A multi-sport athlete, Lalich played basketball and baseball at Ohio University. Playing the center position, he was a four year starter for the basketball team. In 1987 he was inducted into the Ohio University Athletics Hall of Fame.

Professional career
Lalich played professionally in the National Basketball League with the Sheboygan Redskins, the Cleveland Chase Brassmen, the Pittsburgh Raiders and the Youngstown Bears. In 1946, Lalich joined the Cleveland Rebels. He appeared in one game for the team in the Basketball Association of America where he attempted one field goal and was credited with one personal foul.

Later life
Following his basketball career, Lalich worked for 35 years for Western & Southern Life Insurance Company, retiring in 1980 as divisional vice-president of sales.

Personal
He was the son of Serbian immigrants and his older brother, Nick Lalich, was also a professional basketball player for the 1945–46 Youngstown Bears in the NBL and was the leader of the OSS team that rescued about 550 downed air crews during World War II Operation Halyard, without losing a single life or a single plane.

BAA career statistics

Regular season

References

External links
 

1920 births
2008 deaths
American men's basketball players
American people of Serbian descent
Cleveland Chase Brassmen players
Cleveland Rebels players
Forwards (basketball)
Ohio Bobcats baseball players
Ohio Bobcats men's basketball players
Pittsburgh Raiders players
Sheboygan Red Skins players
Youngstown Bears players